Māhāulepū Beach is a beach on the southeast coast of the Hawaiian island of Kauai. The beach is separated into three different parts: Gillin's Beach, Kawailoa Bay, and Hāula Beach. Gillin's Beach, the center section, is known for petroglyphs that are carved into the rocks, though they are rarely exposed. Fossils of extinct birds have been found in sand dunes along the shoreline, including the Kauai Stilt-owl (Grallistrix auceps), a flightless rail, and three species of goose. Close to the beach is the paleontologically important Makauwahi Cave.

References

External links

Additional Mahaulepu Beach Information
Info on Poipu Beaches

Beaches of Kauai
Archaeological sites in Hawaii